René Thomas (7 March 1886 – 23 September 1975) was a French motor racing champion. Thomas was also a pioneer aviator. He won the 1914 Indianapolis 500.

Biography
He was born on 7 March 1886 in Périgueux, France.

A leading driver in his native France, René Thomas traveled to the United States to compete in the Indianapolis 500 on four occasions. He won the 1914 Indianapolis 500 on his inaugural try driving a Delage.

He was given leave from the French Army during World War I  so he could continue to race. Laminated spring steel steering wheel were manufactured in the inter-war period engraved with Rene Thomas portrait and signature and were used particularly on Delage motorcars but also championed by racing ace Jean Chassagne on his winning 1922 TT Sunbeam.

On 28 May 1973 he returned to Indianapolis to drive his winning Delage in a series of parade laps, prior to the start of the 1973 Indianapolis 500. Although he did not drive the car himself, he did sit in the seat where the riding mechanic would sit.

He died on 23 September 1975 in Paris, France, at age 89.

Aviation
Beginning around 1910 Thomas flew airplanes for the Antoinette company whose president was Leon Levavasseur. Hubert Latham was one of Thomas's fellow Antoinette test pilots. Thomas competed in early aviation competitions throughout Europe. In Milan Italy in October 1910 Thomas was involved in the world's first mid-air collision when his Antoinette monoplane fell onto the Farman biplane of Scottish aviator Captain Bertram Dickson. Thomas miraculously was not seriously injured but Dickson suffered internal injuries and never fully recovered, eventually dying in 1913.

Indy 500 results

References

1886 births
1975 deaths
French racing drivers
Indianapolis 500 drivers
Indianapolis 500 polesitters
Indianapolis 500 winners
Land speed record people
French aviators
People from Périgueux
Sportspeople from Dordogne
French military personnel of World War I